CB1 may refer to:

 CB1, a postcode district in the CB postcode area
 Cannabinoid receptor 1, a receptor for cannabinoids in the brain
 Crash Bandicoot (video game), the first game in the Crash Bandicoot series
 Manhattan Community Board 1